Paul Simeoni (born 19 March 1938) is a French former professional footballer who played as a goalkeeper. He spent the entirety of his ten-year career at Cannes, where he made 165 league appearances, including five in the Division 1.

References 

1938 births
Living people
French footballers
Association football goalkeepers
AS Cannes players
Ligue 2 players
Ligue 1 players